M. cornutus may refer to:
 Mantidactylus cornutus, a frog species
 Mecolaesthus cornutus, a house spider species in the genus Mecolaesthus
 Metopoceros cornutus, an iguana species in the genus Metopoceros
 Mimetus cornutus, a pirate spider species in the genus Memetus
 Modisimus cornutus, a vibrating spider species in the genus Modisimus
 Mughiphantes cornutus, a money spider species in the genus Mughiphantes

See also
 Cornutus (disambiguation)